Herpystis is a genus of moths belonging to the subfamily Olethreutinae of the family Tortricidae.

Species
Herpystis assimulatana Kuznetzov, 1997
Herpystis avida Meyrick, 1911
Herpystis cuscutae Bradley, 1968
Herpystis esson Razowski, 2013
Herpystis iodryas Meyrick in Caradja & Meyrick, 1937
Herpystis isolata Razowski, 2013
Herpystis jejuna Meyrick, 1916
Herpystis maurodicha Clarke, 1976
Herpystis mica Kuznetzov, 1988
Herpystis mimica Clarke, 1976
Herpystis pallidula Meyrick, 1912
Herpystis rusticula Meyrick, 1911
Herpystis theodora Clarke, 1976
Herpystis tinctoria Meyrick, 1916

See also
List of Tortricidae genera

References

External links
tortricidae.com

Eucosmini
Tortricidae genera
Taxa named by Edward Meyrick